Trincomalee may refer to:

 Trincomalee, a town in Eastern Province, Sri Lanka
 Trincomalee District, a district in Eastern Province, Sri Lanka
 Trincomalee Electoral District, a multi-member electoral district of Sri Lanka
 Trincomalee Electoral District (1947–1989), a former single-member electoral district of Sri Lanka
 Trincomalee Harbour, a large natural harbour in the town of Trincomalee
 1995 Trincomalee massacre, also known as 1996 Trincomalee massacre or 1996 Killiveddy massacre or Kumarapuram massacre, refers to the murder of 24 civilians allegedly by the Sri Lankan security forces on February 11, 1996, in a village called Kumarapuram in the district of Trincomalee
 2006 Trincomalee massacre, a massacre of five high school students in Trincomalee
 2006 Trincomalee massacre of NGO workers, also known as the Muttur massacre, refers to the massacre of 17 employees of the French INGO Action Against Hunger in August 2006 in the town of Muttur, Trincomalee District
 HMS Trincomalee, a Royal Navy sailing frigate from the 19th century
 Trincomali Channel, a channel or strait in the Gulf Islands of British Columbia, Canada